The Hotel Saratoga is located on the Paseo del Prado, in Old Havana near the Fuente de la India. Built in 1880 for warehouses, it was remodeled as a hotel in 1933 and reopened in 2005. A gas explosion occurred at the hotel on 6 May 2022, killing forty-seven people.

History 

The Hotel Saratoga is located in front of the Parque de la Fraternidad near the Capitolio Building in Havana, Cuba. Spanish merchant Gregorio Palacio y Pérez commissioned the building. Originally, it was a three-story building.
 
Its first location was on Calle Monte.  Later it was moved to the surroundings of the Campo de Marte (now the Parque de la Fraternidad) and called the Alcázar.

The central location and the views made it a preferred destination for international visitors. In 1935, tourist guides highlighted the hotel as one of the best in Havana. Its terrace, called Aires Libres, was an important cultural and traditional center in the 20th century.

Revolutionary period

Like most businesses in Cuba in the 1960s the Hotel Saratoga was confiscated by the revolutionary government. Until then, the building had maintained its vitality. After the takeover by the revolutionary government, it became a tenement building with multiple subdivisions until it was vacated due to its poor condition. In 1996, the property was transferred to Hotel Saratoga S.A., a Cuban joint-venture company owned jointly by Habaguanex S.A., the commercial arm of the City Historian's Office, and an international consortium of investors. The original building was gutted, and only the street façades on Paseo del Prado and Dragones remained. A new building was constructed behind the original façades, including a two-level basement, a mezzanine level, and additional floors. It was reopened in 2005 as a five-star hotel with 96 rooms, three bars, two restaurants, a roof-top swimming pool, and a business center. Its architecture recalled the colonial era and had an eclectic character with a large number of elements of interest such as French carpentry, ceramics, and Cuban marble. The two original facades were destroyed by the explosion.

2022 explosion

An explosion occurred on 6 May 2022 at the hotel, killing forty-seven people, including one Spanish tourist.  The cause was attributed to an accident while resupplying the building with gas.

Gallery

See also

Gran Hotel Manzana Kempinski La Habana
Hotel San Carlos, Havana
Royal Palm Hotel (Havana)
Hotel Perla de Cuba, Havana
Fuente de la India
Paseo del Prado, Havana

Notes

References

External links

Official site of the Office of the Historian of Havana City
2006 article including the Saratoga as one of the five best rooftop pools
Article about opening of hotel (in Spanish)
- video showing hotel interior in mid-2010s
Coral Capital quietly funds Cuba ventures.
Cuba probes British fund, arrests top executive
From now on you have no name. You are prisoner 217': life in a Cuban jail
Business: Investing in Cuba Is More Than Just a Financial Gamble

Architecture in Havana
Architecture in Cuba
Buildings and structures in Havana
Hotels in Havana
Streets in Havana